Namibia Nature Foundation established in 1987 is non-governmental organization located in Windhoek, Namibia which was set up under a deed of trust as a non-profit organization with an unrelated board of trust. It was initially established to help the Department of Nature Conservation to raise and administer funds for the conservation of wildlife and protected area management. The Namibia Nature Foundation is a member of the International Union for Conservation of Nature.

The primary aims of the foundation are to promote sustainable development, the conservation of biological diversity and natural ecosystems, and the wise and ethical use of natural resources for the benefit of all Namibians, both present and future.

The foundation's slogan is "Love Namibia, Love Nature".

Projects
The Namibia Nature Foundation supports projects working in a wide range of programme areas and cross-cutting principles within the general areas of transboundary conservation initiatives, community based natural resource management, environmental education and social ecology.

Many of the projects and working groups which the foundation supports are carrying out a range of research projects. In addition, recent research projects with which it has been involved include:

Funding
Namibia Nature Foundation manages grant programmes on behalf of partners offering funding opportunities to organisations for conservation and sustainable development projects.

Partners
Some of the partner organizations of the foundation include the Information System for Rare & High Value Species, the Namibia Association of CBNRM Support Organisations, Namibia Community Based Tourism Association (NACOBTA), the Desert Research Foundation of Namibia, NamPower, Rössing Foundation,  the Namibian Ministry of Environment and Tourism, and Bonny Vainö Idhenga Foundation (BVIF) among others.

References

External links
Namibia Nature Foundation
GreenEarthMoon Website

Nature reserves in Namibia
Parks in Namibia
Charities based in Namibia
Foundations based in Namibia
Environmental charities